Tullaroan Church is a medieval church and National Monument in County Kilkenny, Ireland.

Location
Tullaroan Church is located immediately south of Tullaroan, on the east bank of a tributary of the Munster River.

Church

Tullaroan Parish Church consisted of nave and chancel.

Other features are a sedilia, Gothic door, and choir-arch.

Grace's Chapel was founded in 1543 by Sir John (Le) Grace (died 1568) and is attached to the south side of the parish church.

References

Churches in County Kilkenny
Archaeological sites in County Kilkenny
National Monuments in County Kilkenny
Former churches in the Republic of Ireland